Septoria campanulae is a fungal plant pathogen infecting bellflowers.

References

External links 
 Index Fungorum
 USDA ARS Fungal Database

campanluae
Fungal plant pathogens and diseases
Ornamental plant pathogens and diseases
Fungi described in 1846
Taxa named by Joseph-Henri Léveillé